English prefixes are affixes (i.e., bound morphemes that provide lexical meaning) that are added before either simple roots or complex bases (or operands) consisting of (a) a root and other affixes, (b) multiple roots, or (c) multiple roots and other affixes. Examples of these follow:
 undo (consisting of prefix un- and root do)
 untouchable (consisting of prefix un-, root touch, and suffix -able)
 non-childproof (consisting of prefix non-, root child, and suffix -proof)
 non-childproofable (consisting of prefix non-, root child, root proof, and suffix -able)

English words may consist of multiple prefixes: anti-pseudo-classicism (containing both an anti- prefix and a pseudo- prefix).

In English, all prefixes are derivational. This contrasts with English suffixes, which may be either derivational or inflectional.

Selectional restrictions 
As is often the case with derivational morphology, many English prefixes can only be added to bases of particular lexical categories (or "parts of speech"). For example, the prefix re- meaning "again, back" is only added to verb bases as in rebuild, reclaim, reuse, resell, re-evaluate, resettle. It cannot be added to bases of other lexical categories. Thus, examples of re- plus a noun base (such as the ungrammatical *rehusband, *remonopoly) or re- plus an adjective base (*renatural, *rewise) are virtually unattested.

These selectional restrictions on what base a prefix can be attached to can be used to distinguish between otherwise identical-sounding prefixes. For instance, there are two different un- prefixes in English: one meaning "not, opposite of", the other meaning "reverse action, deprive of, release from". The first prefix un- "not" is attached to adjective and participle bases while the second prefix un- "reverse action" is attached to either verb or noun bases. Thus, English can have two words that are pronounced and spelled the same and have the same lexical category but have different meanings, different prefixes, a different internal morphological structure, and different internal bases that the prefixes are attached to:

 unlockable "not able to be locked"
 unlockable "able to be unlocked"

In the first unlockable "not able to be locked", the prefix un- "not" is attached to an adjective base lockable (which, in turn, is composed of lock + -able). This word has the following internal structure:

 [ un [ [ lock ]verb able ]adj ]adj

In the second unlockable "able to be unlocked", the prefix un- "reverse action" is attached to a verb base lock, resulting in the derived verb unlock. Subsequently, the -able suffix is added after the newly created unlock adjective base deriving the adjective unlockable. This word has the following internal structure:

 [ [ un [ lock ]verb ]verb able ]adj

Only certain verbs or nouns can be used to form a new verb having the opposite meaning. In particular, using verbs describing an irreversible action produces words often considered nonsense, e.g. unkill, unspend, unlose, unring. These words may nevertheless be in occasional use for humorous or other effect.

Changes in lexical category 

Unlike derivational suffixes, English derivational prefixes typically do not change the lexical category of the base (and are so called class-maintaining prefixes). Thus, the word do, consisting of a single morpheme, is a verb as is the word redo, which consists of the prefix re- and the base root do.

However, there are a few prefixes in English that are class-changing in that the word resulting after prefixation belongs to a lexical category that is different from the lexical category of the base. Examples of this type include a-, be-, and en-. a- typically creates adjectives from noun and verb bases: blaze (noun/verb) > ablaze (adj). The relatively unproductive be- creates transitive verbs from noun bases: witch (noun) > bewitch (verb). en- creates transitive verbs from noun bases: slave (noun) > enslave (verb).

Native vs. non-native (neo-classical) prefixing 

Several English words are analyzed as a combination of a dependent affix and an independent base, such as those found in words like boy-hood or un-just. Following Marchand (1969), these types of words are formed by native word-formation processes.

Other words in English (and also in French and German) are formed via foreign word-formation processes, particularly processes seen in Greek and Latin word-formation. These word types are often known as neo-classical (or neo-Latin) words and are often found in academic learned vocabulary domains (such as in science fields), as well as in inkhorn terms coined in the 17th and 18th centuries. Words of this nature are borrowed from either Greek or Latin or have been newly coined based upon Greek and Latin word-formation processes. It is possible to detect varying degrees of foreignness.

In some analytic frameworks, such neo-classical prefixes are excluded from analyses of English derivation on the grounds that they are not analyzable according to a mostly synchronic (that is, relatively productive or easily recognizable and relating to present-day idioms) English (that is, "native") basis. Conceptualized thus, anglicized neo-classical English words such as deceive are not analyzed by Marchand as being composed of a prefix de- and a bound base -ceive but are rather analyzed as being composed of a single morpheme (although the Latin sources of these English words are analyzed as such, as "native" Latin components in the Latin language). Similarly, pairs such as defend/defense and double (or duple)/duplicity are not considered morphologically related in Marchand's treatment of English word formation and are thus excluded too, though they are regarded as derivatives of the shared roots in Jespersen's and Koizul's, while in others, they may be seen as allomorphs or variants (like deep/depth, a pair formed of Germanic components). However, not all foreign words are unanalyzable according to such an English basis: some foreign elements have been nativized and have become a part of productive English word-formation processes. An example of such a now native English prefix is co- as in co-worker, which is ultimately derived from the Latin prefix com- (with its allomorphs co-, col-, con-, and cor-); and ex- as in ex-soldier, which derives from the Latin ex-.

Initial combining forms vs prefixes 

 Combining form

List of English prefixes

Native

Neo-classical

Archaic

See also 

 Number prefix
 English grammar
 English compound
 Affix
 List of Greek and Latin roots in English

Notes

Bibliography 
 Adams, Valerie. (1973). An introduction to modern English word-formation. London: Longman.
 Ayers, Donald M. (1986). English words from Latin and Greek elements (2nd & rev. ed.). Tucson: The University of Arizona Press.
 Bauer, Laurie. (1983). English word-formation. Cambridge: Cambridge University Press.
 Bauer, Laurie; Lieber, Rochelle; Plag, Ingo (2013). The Oxford Reference Guide to English Morphology. Oxford, UK: Oxford University Press.
 Brown, Roland W. (1927). Materials for word-study: A manual of roots, prefixes, suffixes and derivatives in the English language. New Haven, CT: Van Dyck & Co.
 Cannon, Garland Hampton. (1987). Historical change and English word-formation: Recent vocabulary. New York: P. Lang.
 Jespersen, Otto. (1942). A modern English grammar on historical principles: Morphology (Part 6). London: George Allen & Unwin and Ejnar Munksgaard.
 Marchand, Hans. (1969). The categories and types of present-day English word-formation (2nd ed.). München: C. H. Beck.
 Quirk, Randolph; Greenbaum, Sidney; Leech, Geoffrey; & Svartvik, Jan. (1985). Appendix I: Word-formation. In A comprehensive grammar of the English language (pp. 1517–1585). Harlow: Longman.
 Simpson, John (Ed.). (1989). ''Oxford English dictionary (2nd ed.). Oxford: Oxford University Press.

External links 
 Chart of English Language Roots

Prefixes
Prefixes